Pervin Chakar (born 1981, Mardin) is a Kurdish opera singer living in Europe. Having trained as a singer in Turkey and Italy, she currently resides in Germany.

Early life and education 
Chakar was born into a Kurdish family from Mardin, Turkey, in 1981 and attended the fine arts high school in Diyarbakır, where she also took cello lessons. During her studies at the Anatolian High School, she took up writing and with one her stories she participated in a competition in Ankara. At the competitions party she was singing the song Ich Liebe Dich (I love you) by Ludwig van Beethoven, which has impressed one of the jurors to the extent he gave her a CD of the opera singer Maria Callas. Listening to Callas inspired her to pursue a career as a soprano. She graduated with a bachelor's degree from the Gazi University in Ankara in 2003, becoming a singing teacher.

Professional career 
Later she sang as Rosina in The Barber of Seville, Titania in the A Midsummer Night's Dream by William Shakespeare or Megacles in the L'Olympiade by Josef Mysliveček. She has sung in several languages of the ancient Mesopotamia such as Armenian, Kurdish, Zazaki and performed Kurdish folksongs from the Ottoman Armenian composer Komitas Vartabend for his 150th anniversary in the Cemal Reşit Rey Concert Hall in Istanbul. Since 2016 she lives in Baden-Baden, Germany.

On singing in the Kurdish language 
She has only in 2011 decided to learn the Kurdish language, after having been confronted with news on the Roboski airstrike in which several Kurdish villagers were killed and mistaken for militants of the Kurdistan Workers Party (PKK). Onwards she learned songs from Kurdish singers and became a strong supporter of performing in the Kurdish language also having composed a melody to the Kurdish poem Qimil by Musa Anter.

In 2022, Çakar claimed that her concert at Mardin Artuklu University, which opened the first Kurdish course in Turkey, was canceled because there were Kurdish songs in her repertoire. A former lawmaker of the Justice and Development Party (AKP) Abdurrahman Kurt attempted to weigh with the Universities rector, but was not able to change their mind. The Turkish daily Yeni Safak claimed that the reason given for the cancellation was the fact that she wanted to go on a stage that was free of charge, while trying to sell tickets for a price. Students that went to the event posted videos of the event of artists singing in Kurdish, contradicting her claim.

References 

1981 births
Kurdish language
Kurdish singers
Turkish opera singers
Living people
People from Mardin Province
Gazi University alumni